The Prova Ciclística 9 de Julho (Portuguese for July 9 Cycling Race) is a single day road bicycle racing event held in Brazil. It was created in 1933 by journalist Cásper Líbero. He worked at the Gazeta Esportiva sports newspaper and created the race to honor the Constitutionalist Revolution that occurred in the state of São Paulo on that date the previous year. The race currently exists as both a men's and women's competition. The men's competition is part of the UCI America Tour. The women's competition has been held since 1990.

Race Circuits

Past winners

References
 Gazeta Esportiva Timeline (portuguese)
 All champions (portuguese)
 2008 Results
 2007 Results (men)
 2007 Winners
 2006 Results (men)
 2006 Results
 2005 Results
 2004 Results
 2003 Results
 2002 Results
 2001 Results

Cycle races in Brazil
Sport in São Paulo
Women's road bicycle races
Recurring sporting events established in 1933
UCI America Tour races
1933 establishments in Brazil